Zion Baptist Church in Collinsville, Mississippi is a Carpenter Gothic church built in 1910–11.  It was listed on the National Register of Historic Places (NRHP) in 2002.

According to its NRHP nomination, it was deemed significant "because of the quality of its architectural detail as a rural, vernacular church built during the early 1900s, and its unusually high degree of integrity."

The church building replaced a previous building on the site.

Its  property includes a cemetery with graves of immigrants from about 1860 on, including from England, Scotland, and Ireland.  An African-American cemetery also associated with the church is outside the listed property, accessed through a fence.

References

Churches on the National Register of Historic Places in Mississippi
Churches completed in 1910
Carpenter Gothic church buildings in Mississippi
Churches in Lauderdale County, Mississippi
National Register of Historic Places in Lauderdale County, Mississippi